David Dalrymple may refer to:

Sir David Dalrymple, 1st Baronet (1665–1721)
David Dalrymple, Lord Westhall (1719–1784) Scottish law lord
David Dalrymple, Lord Hailes (1726–1792), baronet and Lord Advocate
David Dalrymple (Australian politician) (1840–1912), Member of the Queensland Legislative Assembly